The Best International Athlete ESPY Award is an award given to the sportsperson adjudged to have been the best or most outstanding of those born outside, or not possessing citizenship, of the United States who contest a major international sport in a given calendar year. From 2008 to 2009, the award was split into Best Female International Athlete ESPY Award and Best Male International Athlete ESPY Award. The women's version of the award for 2008 and 2009 were presented to Mexican professional golfer Lorena Ochoa. The award was discontinued after 2009, but was reinstated in 2012.

In 2018, the award was restricted to soccer and renamed Best International Men's Soccer Player, and a women's version of the award, also specific to soccer, was introduced at that time. Eligibility was still based on citizenship, regardless of the player's club affiliation. The 2018 and 2019 awards for the women's version were given to Australian soccer player Sam Kerr. The award's name was changed again in 2021 to Best International Athlete, Men's Soccer, with the women's award undergoing an identical name change. The eligibility criteria also changed; both awards are now presented to soccer players who play at club level outside the United States, without regard to citizenship. The 2021 women's version of this award, and the first under the current eligibility criteria, was presented to Sam Mewis, an American who played her club soccer at Manchester City.

Balloting for the award was conducted over the Internet by fans from amongst choices selected by the ESPN Select Nominating Committee. The ESPY Awards ceremony has been conducted in June or July since the 2002 ceremony; all awards conferred in that period reflect performance and achievement over the twelve months previous to presentation, which may span one or two seasons depending upon the recipient's particular sport. The award wasn't awarded in 2020 due to the COVID-19 pandemic.

List of winners

See also
Associated Press Athlete of the Year
United Press International Athlete of the Year Award

References

ESPY Awards
Awards established in 2006
Awards disestablished in 2009
Awards established in 2012